Sue Carol (born Evelyn Jean Lederer, October 30, 1906 – February 4, 1982) was an American actress and talent agent. Carol's film career lasted from the late 1920s into the 1930s; when it ended, she became a talent agent. The last of her four marriages was to one of her clients, Alan Ladd, from 1942 until his death in 1964.

Early life and career
Carol was born Evelyn Jean Lederer in Chicago, Illinois, to Samuel and Caroline Lederer, Jewish emigrants from Austria and Germany, respectively.

While Carol was in Hollywood on vacation, a director offered her a screen test that resulted in a contract with Fox. She took it and began playing minor parts. One of the WAMPAS Baby Stars, she performed in motion pictures from 1927 until 1937. 

Among the movies in which she appeared are Fox Movietone Follies of 1929 and Girls Gone Wild (both 1929). Her films were made in association with producer Cecil B. DeMille and Metro-Goldwyn-Mayer. After retiring from acting in the late 1930s, Carol established her own talent agency, the Sue Carol Agency.

Personal life
As a young woman, Carol married Allen H. Keefer, a buyer for a Chicago stock yard firm, divorcing in early 1929. In July 1929, Carol became engaged to actor Nick Stuart, and the couple married that November. They had a daughter, actress Carol Lee Ladd (born 1932), who was briefly married to actor Richard Anderson. In 1933, Sue Carol was cleared in a case involving the disappearance of a baby from a Brooklyn, New York, family. The family had complained that the baby had been taken for adoption in November 1932 by a woman who said she was acting on behalf of Carol. The Stuarts divorced in 1934. On Oct. 30, 1936 in Los Angeles, Carol married for the third time to fellow actor William Harold Wilson. That marriage also ended in divorce.

She married actor Alan Ladd on March 15, 1942, in Mexico. They had a son, David, and a daughter, Alana Ladd Jackson (married to radio commentator Michael Jackson). Carol was also the stepmother of Alan Ladd, Jr. She was Alan Ladd's manager until his death.

Death
Carol died on February 4, 1982, in Los Angeles, California, from a heart attack and is interred next to Alan Ladd in the Forest Lawn Memorial Park Cemetery in Glendale, California.

For her contribution to the motion picture industry, in 1982, Carol has a star on the Hollywood Walk of Fame at 1639 N. Vine Street. In 1998, a Golden Palm Star on the Palm Springs, California, Walk of Stars was dedicated to her.

Filmography

References
Notes

Bibliography
 The New York Times, "Sue Carol To Wed Nick Stuart", July 23, 1929, Page 32.
 The New York Times, "Sue Carol Secretly Wed", November 29, 1929, Page 27.
 The New York Times, "Sue Carol Cleared In Baby Case", February 8, 1933, Page 17.
 The New York Times, "Sue Carol Ladd, Ex-Actress And Widow of Alan Ladd, 72", February 6, 1982, Page 16.

External links

 
 
 Photographs and literature

1906 births
1982 deaths
20th-century American actresses
Actresses from Chicago
American film actresses
American people of Austrian-Jewish descent
American people of German-Jewish descent
American silent film actresses
American talent agents
Burials at Forest Lawn Memorial Park (Glendale)
Jewish American actresses
20th-century American businesspeople
20th-century American businesswomen
Ladd family (show business)
WAMPAS Baby Stars
20th-century American Jews